James Angell may refer to:

 James Burrill Angell (1829–1916), President of the University of Vermont and the University of Michigan, U.S. Minister to China and Turkey
 James Rowland Angell (1869–1949), President of Yale University, son of former

See also

James Angel (disambiguation)